Maubec is a commune in the Isère department in southeastern France.

Population

Twin towns
Maubec is twinned with:

  Zwischenwasser, Austria, since 1998

See also
Communes of the Isère department

References

Communes of Isère
Isère communes articles needing translation from French Wikipedia